Orb Energy is a solar energy company headquartered in Bangalore, India, founded by Damian Miller and NP Ramesh in 2006.

History
Orb Energy was founded in 2006 by Damian Miller and NP Ramesh in Bangalore, India. The company opened its first branch in Kumta, India. The company reached 100 branches in Karnataka by 2015.

The company offers collateral free solar loans to small and medium sized firms to help adopt rooftop solar systems.

Till October, 2019 the company has installed over 160,000 solar systems in India with 160 megawatts megawatts as total capacity.

Funding
In 2017, the company raised $15 million (INR 95 crores) from The Netherlands Development Finance Company (FMO), The US Government’s Overseas Private Investment Corporation (OPIC), and The German Investment Corporation (DEG).

In 2019, Shell acquired 20% stake in Orb Energy.

The company also received funds from Bamboo Capital Partners (Luxembourg), Rianta Capital (Switzerland) and Pamiga SA (Luxembourg).

International operations
Orb Energy started its operations in Africa in 2014. The company launched its own subsidiary in Kenya to replicate its Indian Business model in Africa. The company works with local banks to make solar loans available to residential and commercial customers.

Awards and recognition
The company was runner-up in the Zayed Future Energy Prize in 2012. 
In 2014, Orb Energy received Gold Standard (GS) rating from LRQA.
Orb Energy moves to 3rd place in India in 2021 in terms of megawatts of rooftop solar installed
Orb Energy wins Mercom India's 2021 award for "Best C&I Project" under the rooftop solar category

References

External links
 

Companies based in Bangalore
Indian companies established in 2006
Solar energy companies
Renewable energy companies of India
Indian brands
Renewable resource companies established in 2006
2006 establishments in Karnataka